The 2009 Boston Pizza Cup (the Alberta men's curling championship) was held February 11-15 at the Wainwright Arena in Wainwright. Defending champion Kevin Martin won again. As winner, Martin represented Alberta and won the 2009 Tim Hortons Brier.

Teams

* Throws third rocks; thirds throw skip rocks

Draw Brackets

A Event

B Event

C Event

Results

Draw 1
February 11, 1300

Draw 2
February 11, 1830

Draw 3
February 12, 0830

Draw 4
February 12, 1330

Draw 5
February 12, 1830

Draw 6
February 13, 0830

Draw 7
February 13, 1330

Draw 8
February 13, 1830

Draw 9
February 14, 1300

Playoffs

C1 vs. C2
February 14, 1830

A vs. B
February 14, 1830

Semi-final
February 15, 0930

Final
February 15, 1400

Qualification
Three teams qualify from Southern Alberta, three from Northern Alberta and two from the Peace Region. In addition, four teams have automatically qualified based on other reasons. Defending World Champion Kevin Martin qualifies as defending champion, plus Kevin Koe as the top remaining Albertan team in the CCA rankings from last season. In addition the top two teams remaining teams on the Alberta Curling Tour receive spots, that being Ted Appelman's team and Randy Ferbey's team.

Boston Pizza Cup
2009 in Alberta
Curling competitions in Alberta
February 2009 sports events in Canada